This is a list of museums in Sardinia, Italy.

References 

Sardinia